, also known as The Diary of Anne Frank, is a 1995 Japanese anime film based on Anne Frank's 1942-1944 The Diary of a Young Girl. It is a feature film by Madhouse, was directed by Akinori Nagaoka and released on August 19, 1995.

Voice cast

Production
Nagaoka's film features new character designs by Katsuyuki Kubo and features a score composed by Michael Nyman, including two songs, "If" (which incorporates "Time Lapse" from A Zed & Two Noughts) and "Why," which have become concert works.  The former also appeared in an altered form in the film, The Libertine.  The singer is contralto Hilary Summers.  "Candlefire" as well as piano-only versions of "If" and Why" appear on Nyman's 2005 release, The Piano Sings.

Release
The Nagaoka film was released with an English language adaptation, via a DVD release in French (as Le Journal d'Anne Frank) with English subtitles. A release in North America was set for 2015, but went unreleased for several years. The English version was finally released for free on the official YouTube channel on May 3, 2020.  The French and English language versions replaced the Michael Nyman score with a new one by Carine H.D. Gutlerner. The international version was shortened to 87 minutes.

Soundtrack 

"If" and "Why" have become staples of Michael Nyman's concerts and were rerecorded as piano solos on The Piano Sings.

Track listing 
Amsterdam Dawn
Anne's Birthday
The Schoolroom
Letter From Germany
Goodbye Moortje
Candlefire
Renewal
Light Of Love
Chatterbox Waltz
Hanukah
Spring Freedom
Concentration Camp
If
First Kiss
D-Day
The Diary Of Hope
Silent Separation
Lament For Lost Youth
Why

Reception
Anime News Network's Justin Sevakis said that "even a story as powerful as Anne Frank's cannot overcome truly odious filmmaking and weird directorial choices that just don't work" and that he couldn't "think of a worse way to experience the story than watching this film".

References

 The Anime Encyclopedia by Jonathan Clements and Helen McCarthy (revised and expanded edition), "Diary of Anne Frank," p. 144

External links
 (Madhouse) 

 

1995 anime films
Anime television films
Japanese biographical films
Films about Anne Frank
Madhouse (company)
TV Asahi original programming
Films scored by Michael Nyman
Animated films based on literature
Historical anime and manga